Stam is a Dutch surname that may refer to

Caroline Stam, Dutch classical soprano
Cees Stam (born 1935), one of many pseudonyms of Hugo Brandt Corstius, Dutch author
Cees Stam (born 1945), Dutch cyclist
Danny Stam (born 1972), Dutch cyclist, son of Cees
Debby Stam (born 1984), Dutch volleyball player
Hans Stam (1919–1996), Dutch water polo player
Jaap Stam (born 1972), Dutch footballer
Jessica Stam (born 1986), Canadian model
Jos Stam, Dutch-born computer graphics specialist
Katie Stam (born 1986), American beauty queen and Miss America 2009
Koen Stam (born 1987), Dutch footballer
Marieke Stam (born 1961), retired Dutch speed skater
Mart Stam (1889–1986), Dutch architect
Neil Stam, (born 1942), American footballer
Paul Stam (born 1950), American politician
Robert Stam, American film theorist
Ron Stam (born 1984), Dutch footballer
Stefan Stam (born 1979), Dutch footballer

See also 
 The Murder of John and Betty Stam, in China in 1934
 Stamm

Dutch-language surnames